Baringo North Constituency is an electoral constituency in Kenya. It is one of six constituencies in Baringo County. The constituency was established for the 1963 elections. The constituency has ten wards, all electing councillors for the Baringo County Council.

Daniel arap Moi, who later became the Kenyan president, was the first Baringo North MP. In the 1966 elections, he switched to represent Baringo Central Constituency.

Members of Parliament

Wards

References 

Constituencies in Baringo County
Constituencies in Rift Valley Province
1963 establishments in Kenya
Constituencies established in 1963